Shui Fong (水房幫 - Lit. Water Room Gang), also known as the Wo On Lok (WOL), is one of the main Triad groups in Southern China, operating especially in Hong Kong, Macau and Chinese communities abroad.

Today it is one of Hong Kong's most active triad groups, along with Sun Yee On, 14K and the "Wo" family of triads, especially the Wo Shing Wo. It runs extortion operations, loan sharking, narcotics and the control of nightclubs, mahjong dens and massage parlours. According to police, its turf extends across Yau Ma Tei, Tsim Sha Tsui, Mong Kok and Sham Shui Po.

In Macau, Shui Fong is one of the "Four Major Gangs", the others being Wo Shing Yee, 14K and the Big Circle Gang.

History
Shui Fong originated from a workers' union of the legacy Hong Kong soft drink company, Connaught Aerated Water Company, in Sham Shui Po in the 1930s.

It was allegedly involved in a fight for casinos in Macau during the 1990s. They were involved in a high-profile gang war with perennial rivals the 14K, led in Macau by 'Broken Tooth Koi' during this period.

In Hong Kong in 2009, the group elected as leaders 'Fei Wai' and 'Sam Chuen'.  However, when the pair refused to stand down in 2011, a series of violent and very public confrontations ensued between their supporters and those of two rivals - known as 'Chi Fung' and 'Dai Ma', lasting into 2013.

On 15 January 2010, a 15-year-old boy was killed during a clash between 14K Triad and Shui Fong members at Lower Wong Tai Sin Estate. Fifteen people were arrested in connection with the boy's murder, aged 15 to 22. The victim died after being punched, kicked, and hit by glass bottles.

International activity

Benelux
Shui Fong is one of seven triad groups documented as being active in the Benelux countries.

Canada
Lai Tong Sang, the alleged "dragon head" (boss) of the Shui Fong in Macau who arrived in Canada on October 28, 1996 on a permanent resident visa, was ordered deported from the country in August 2013 after he was deemed not admissible due to his ties to organized crime. Lai was the target of a drive-by shooting at his Vancouver home in July 1997. A 14K member in Hong Kong had asked the 14K in Canada to kill Lai in relation to the conflict between the rival groups in Macau at the time. Documents filed with the Federal Court of Canada show that Lai laundered millions of dollars in Canada as immigration officials waited over a decade for access to police wiretap information that allowed them to move to have him deported.

Ireland
The Shui Fong operates in Dublin and Belfast. Reports of Shui Fong activity in Ireland date back as far as at least 1983.

United Kingdom

The Shui Fong is active in London, Southampton, Glasgow and Belfast. The group established itself in the United Kingdom shortly after the Sino-British Joint Declaration (1984), when news of Hong Kong's return to China caused many gang members to flee to the UK. In comparison to other triad groups in the UK, the Shui Fong engages in lesser crimes such as video piracy, counterfeiting and illegal gambling, although also carries out extortion on the Chinese community.

Restaurant owner and alleged Shui Fong "white paper fan" (business adviser) Philip Wong was murdered by a gang of contract killers armed with machetes in Glasgow on 9 October 1985. It is believed Wong was murdered after refusing to do business with the Wo Shing Wo who wanted a share of his lucrative Chinese video rental business. Three men wanted for the murder have never been traced.

In the first British court case in which a member of a Chinese criminal society gave evidence, five alleged Shui Fong members – Jason Shui Cheung Wan, Tak Kam Chow, David Chong Chi Chan, Danny Wai Yuen Liu, and Wai Wan Ho – were acquitted at the Old Bailey in London in December 1992 of plotting the shooting of Hong Kong businessman Ying Kit Lam. A sixth man, Clifford Wai Ming Tang, was discharged after the jury could not agree on a verdict. George Wai Hen Cheung, who pleaded guilty to shooting Lam, had named the six men as accomplices. Georcge Cheung himself had been initiated into the Triad in the basement of the Princess Garden Restaurant on Greyhound Road, Fulham earlier that year. Lam, who was allegedly attempting to take control of the Shui Fong in the UK, was left crippled after being shot four times in Chinatown, London on 7 September 1991.

See also
 Organised crime

References

External links
Tales From the Dragonhead
Casino Connections
Canadian Immigration
UN body backed Macau deal in corruption case, Nikkei Asian Review, October 8, 2015
Ng Lap Seng sentenced to four years in prison in UN bribery case, Macau Daily Times, 14 May 2018

Sham Shui Po
Triad groups
1930s establishments in Hong Kong
Transnational organized crime
Organised crime groups in Belgium
Organized crime groups in Canada
Gangs in Vancouver
Organized crime groups in China
Organised crime groups in England
Organised crime gangs of London
Organised crime groups in Hong Kong
Organised crime groups in Ireland
Organized crime groups in Macau
Organised crime groups in the Netherlands
Organised crime groups in Northern Ireland
Organised crime groups in Scotland